Bezymyanka is a rural locality (a khutor) in Mikhaylovka Urban Okrug, Volgograd Oblast, Russia. The population was 1,718 as of 2010. There are 43 streets.

Geography 
Bezymyanka is located 30 km south of Mikhaylovka. Abramov is the nearest rural locality.

References 

Rural localities in Mikhaylovka urban okrug